The Poços de Caldas Monorail was a monorail system that served the city of Poços de Caldas in the state of Minas Gerais, Brazil. Its operation started in 1991, only in test phases. In 2000, after the opening, the train derailed in a curve, leading to the opening in the floors of the car, no one was hurt. Since 2003, the system has been out of service and a section of the track was destroyed, making it impossible immediately to resume operations. There are plans for its renovation and for services to be reinstated.

External links
 
 

Monorails
Railway lines opened in 1991
Railway lines closed in 2000